Cyrtodactylus agusanensis is a species of gecko endemic to the southern Philippines. It is sometimes considered conspecific with Cyrtodactylus mamanwa.

References

Cyrtodactylus
Reptiles described in 1915